Paramapania is a genus of flowering plants belonging to the family Cyperaceae.

Its native range is Malesia to Western Pacific.

Species
Species:

Paramapania flaccida 
Paramapania gracillima 
Paramapania longirostris 
Paramapania parvibractea 
Paramapania radians 
Paramapania rostrata 
Paramapania simplex

References

Cyperaceae
Cyperaceae genera